Amorphophallus lacourii is a species of plants in the family Araceae and the monotypics tribe Thomsonieae. Its native range is Indo-China.  It is still known by its synonym Pseudodracontium lacourii, a consequence of Nicholas Edward Brown originally erecting the now obsolete genus Pseudodracontium.  It typically grows to about 50 cm tall. In Vietnamese it is known as nưa bất thường.

References

External links 
 
 

lacourii
Flora of Indo-China